"You Might Think" is a song by American rock band The Cars from their fifth studio album, Heartbeat City (1984). The track was written by Ric Ocasek and produced by Mutt Lange and the Cars, with Ocasek also providing the lead vocals.

The song was released in February 1984, as the first single from Heartbeat City. "You Might Think" peaked at number seven in the United States and number eight in Canada. It also reached number one on the Mainstream Rock Tracks chart in the US, the band's first song to do so. In the United Kingdom, the song reached number 88. It was featured heavily, and served as a plot device, in the 2016 American television series BrainDead and the Season 4 episode "Do or Diaper" from Regular Show.

Music video

The music video is one of the first to use computer graphics. The video features Ocasek and model Susan Gallagher in a series of quirky encounters. Ocasek appears in her bathroom mirror, inside a large periscope that pops up in her bathtub, in her mouth, as a fly, as King Kong on top of the Empire State Building and as the Robot Monster, among other incarnations. The rest of the band appears together and separately throughout the video; after they all appear in the movie-theater scene, keyboardist Greg Hawkes plays the dentist in the scene in which Ocasek is jackhammering a tooth in the girl's mouth. In the King Kong scene, the other three members, guitarist Elliot Easton, bassist Benjamin Orr and drummer David Robinson, are paired off in the two planes flying around Ocasek.

A an alternate video omits the ending where Ric Ocasek "removes" his face, a gush of water with various artifacts from the video streams out from where his face was, and the fly version of Ocasek flys into the screen and spatters green fly guts into the words "The End".  Instead, in the alternate version, his face remains in place and he continues to lip-synch to the lyrics.

"You Might Think" won the first MTV Video Music Award for Video of the Year and was nominated for five more awards (Best Special Effects, Best Art Direction, Viewer's Choice, Best Concept Video and Most Experimental Video) at the 1984 MTV Video Music Awards. The video also won five awards (Best Video, Best Conceptual, Most Innovative, Best Editing and Best Special Effects) at Billboard 1984 Video Music Awards and four awards (Best Achievement In Music Video, Best Editing In Music Video, Best Engineering In Music Video and Best Camerawork In Music Video) at the Videotape Production Association's 1985 Monitor Awards.

Robin Sloane of Elektra Records creative directed the video after director Jeff Stein (of the Who's The Kids Are Alright) showed her samples from New-York-based visual-effects company Charlex. The firm was nationally known for the innovative weekly advertisements that it was producing the National Enquirer. The commercials featured the first use of the Quantel Paintbox, the first tool for artists to use directly on the video screen. Stein, along with Charlex founders Alex Weil and Charlie Levi, directed and produced the video. Danny Rosenberg and Bill Weber served both as editors and video engineers, Kevin Jones was the lighting director, Danny Ducovny the cinematographer and Bob Ryzner the art director. The video cost $80,000 to produce, which was almost triple the average music-video budget of the time.

Track listings
7-inch single
A. "You Might Think" – 3:04
B. "Heartbeat City" – 4:30

12-inch single
A. "You Might Think" – 3:04
B1. "Let's Go" – 3:33
B2. "I Refuse" – 3:16

Credits and personnel

 Ric Ocasek – lead vocals, rhythm guitar
 Ben Orr – backing vocals, bass guitar
 Elliot Easton – lead guitar, backing vocals
 Greg Hawkes – keyboards, backing vocals, Fairlight CMI
 David Robinson – drums
 Mutt Lange - backing vocals

Charts

Weekly charts

Year-end charts

Weezer version 

In 2011, American rock band Weezer covered the song for the soundtrack of the computer-animated spy comedy film Cars 2. Weezer had a relationship with co-vocalist Ocasek, As Ocasek produced three of the band's albums, including 1994's Weezer (Blue Album), 2001's Weezer (Green Album), and 2014's Everything Will Be Alright in the End. On June 14, Weezer announced the cover on Kerrang!, Weezer guitarist Brian Bell announced "The song is going to play in the scene where Lightning McQueen and Mater go to Japan, which is great for us because it sort of mirrors our experiences in Japan -- there was a little bit of culture shock!". The cover was released as the opening track on the same day and a music video was released to the band's Vevo channel on June 21, three days before the film's release, featuring the band recording the song, scenes from the film, people working on the film, and the band in Japan, and was directed by Tim Wilkerson. This version was co-produced by the band and Shawn Everett. Weezer bassist Scott Shriner performed the song with the Cars on their Rock and Roll Hall of Fame induction in 2018, which would be Ocasek's final performance until his death the following year. Weezer's version charted at number 8 on the Mexico Ingles Airplay.

References 

1984 songs
1984 singles
2011 songs
The Cars songs
Weezer songs
Elektra Records singles
MTV Video of the Year Award
Song recordings produced by Ric Ocasek
Song recordings produced by Robert John "Mutt" Lange
Songs written by Ric Ocasek